西, meaning "west", may refer to:
Radical 146 in the Kangxi Dictionary system of classifying Chinese characters
Nishi (surname), Japanese surname
Xi (surname), Chinese surname

See also
Nishi-ku (disambiguation), various districts in Japan
Seo-gu (disambiguation), various districts in South Korea
西山 (disambiguation) ("west mountain")
西海 (disambiguation) ("west sea")
西湖 (disambiguation) ("west lake")